The Laurisilva of Madeira is a natural place declared a World Heritage Site by UNESCO in 1999. It is considered a very valuable relic, due to its size and quality, of the laurisilva, a type of laurel forest that was very abundant in the past and is practically extinct today. It is believed to be 90% primordial forest. The paleobotanical record of the island of Madeira reveals that the laurel forest existed on this island at least 1.8 million years ago.

UNESCO justified the inclusion of this place within the world heritage precisely because it is the largest remaining laurel forest, in the past spread throughout Europe while today is practically extinct. In addition, this type of forest is considered a center of plant biodiversity and contains numerous endemic, residual and rare species, especially bryophytes, ferns and flowering plants. It also has a very rich invertebrate fauna, appearing among the endemic species of the island, the Madeira laurel pigeon.

Gallery

References

Protected areas of Portugal
Geography of Madeira